Tajammul Hussain (18 December 1909 – 18 August 1971) was an Indian cricketer. He played three first-class matches for Delhi between 1934 and 1940.

See also
 List of Delhi cricketers

References

External links
 

1909 births
1971 deaths
Indian cricketers
Delhi cricketers
Cricketers from Delhi